Arthur William Green (5 December 1881 – 24 September 1966) was a Welsh professional footballer who made over 130 appearances as a centre forward in the Football League for Notts County. He also played League football for Nottingham Forest and Stockport County and was capped by Wales at international level.

International career 
Green won eight caps and scored three goals for the Wales national team between 1901 and 1908. He was part of the 1906–07 British Home Championship-winning squad.

Personal life 
Green served in the British Armed Forces during the First World War.

Career statistics

Honours 
Nottingham Forest

 Football League Second Division: 1906–07

Wales

 British Home Championship: 1906–07

References 

English Football League players
British military personnel of World War I
Nottingham Forest F.C. players
Welsh footballers
1881 births
1966 deaths
Footballers from Aberystwyth
Association football forwards
Wales international footballers
Southern Football League players
Aberystwyth Town F.C. players
Swindon Town F.C. players
Aston Villa F.C. players
Ebbw Vale F.C. players
Walsall F.C. players
Notts County F.C. players
Stockport County F.C. players
Brierley Hill Alliance F.C. players
Stourbridge F.C. players
Kidderminster Harriers F.C. players
Dudley Town F.C. players
Worcester City F.C. players